Administrative act may refer to:

 
 
 

 Administrative procedure act
 Administrative Procedure Act (Japan)
 Administrative Procedure Act (United States)

Administrative law